Iracema caiana is a species of sand knifefish endemic to Brazil where it is found in the Jauaperi River basin.  It is the only member of its genus.

References
 

Rhamphichthyidae
Fish of Brazil
Endemic fauna of Brazil
Fish described in 1996